Saint Dyfan was an obscure Welsh martyr and saint.

Dyfan may also refer to:

 Saint Deruvian, who is often mistakenly conflated with St Dyfan
 Merthyr Dyfan (Welsh for "martyrium of Dyfan"), a community and parish in southeastern Wales
 Dyfan, an electoral ward in the south Wales town of Barry
 Dyfan, Bishop of Bangor in northern Wales